Geoffrey Regan (born 15 July 1946) is an English author of popular history, former senior school teacher and broadcaster. He has authored books focused on military failures, and has written for newspapers and periodicals such as USA Today and History Today.

Education and career
Regan attended Sudbury Grammar School from 1957 onwards, University of Kent from 1965–1970, receiving his B.A. and M.A., and took his Postgraduate Certificate in Education at University of London in 1972.  He taught at senior school level from 1971 through to 1990. He lives in Surrey, England.

Reception
Kirkus Reviews, describing Regan as author of "numerous popular military histories", wrote that Lionhearts "shines a soft, flattering light" on the warring leaders Saladin and Richard I, and scarcely condemns atrocities against captives.

A review of Great Military Disasters in the U.S. Air Force's Air Power Journal referred to it as "in depth"; the author's "historical perspective demonstrates the usefulness of studying history to gain insight, temper judgement, and train the mind." The St. Louis Post-Dispatch stated that with the book's "melancholy roll-call of failure, the student of military history might well wonder how anybody wins."

Fight or Flight was described in its 1996 Air Power Journal review as "readable, well organized, and extremely accessible", and "with an increasing number of military books dealing with technology, [. . . ], it is refreshing to find a book that emphasizes the one element found in all combat - people."

Works
He has published more than 40 books, including: 
 Great Military Disasters: A Historical Survey of Military Incompetence 1988. 
 The Guinness Book of Military Blunders Guinness. 1991. 
 Fight or Flight 1996. 
 Lionhearts: Saladin, Richard I, and the Era of the Third Crusade 1999.  
 Backfire: A History of Friendly Fire 1999. 
 Great Military Blunders 2000, . Regan was the Series Consultant for the Channel Four television series Great Military Blunders  
 Naval Blunders 2000. 
 Royal Blunders 2004. 
 Battles That Changed History 2006. 
 First Crusader: Byzantium's Holy Wars 2003.

References

External links
 .

1946 births
Living people
Alumni of the University of London
English military historians
Alumni of the University of Kent